Kreft is a surname. Notable people with the surname include: 

Bratko Kreft (1905-1996), Slovenian playwright
Galina Kreft (1950-2005), Soviet sprint canoer
Hermann Kreft (1823-1878), Rhenish Missionary in South West Africa
Jon Kreft (born 1986), American basketball player
Lev Kreft (born 1951), Slovenian politician
Tony Kreft (born 1945), New Zealand rugby player